Aleksandar Kotuljac (born 2 November 1981) is a German retired professional footballer who played as a striker.

Career
Born in Hanover, Kotuljac spent his youth with various clubs in his hometown of Hanover before moving to Hannover 96 in 1997. In 2000, he joined Hannover 96's reserve team and went on to score more than 40 goals in the next four seasons. As Hannover's reserves are a U23 team, Kotuljac left the club in 2004, joining Oberliga Nord side Eintracht Nordhorn. At the end of the 2004–05 season he left for then NOFV-Oberliga Süd side 1. FC Magdeburg.

Here Kotuljac scored 11 goals in 21 matches in his first season, and he won promotion to Regionalliga Nord with his new club. However, in a match against ZFC Meuselwitz Kotuljac was injured severely and was ruled out for the rest of the year. Only in February 2007 could he come back to play, and he scored nine goals in 17 matches in the Regionalliga Nord. At the end of the season 1. FC Magdeburg narrowly missed out on promotion to 2. Bundesliga, and Kotuljac was allowed to leave on a free transfer for SpVgg Greuther Fürth. In the 2007–08 season he established himself in the first team, scoring six goals in 29 matches. On 23 June 2009, he signed  for VfL Osnabrück.

References

External links
 
 

1981 births
Living people
Footballers from Hanover
German footballers
Association football forwards
Eintracht Nordhorn players
1. FC Magdeburg players
VfL Osnabrück players
Hannover 96 II players
SpVgg Greuther Fürth players
Sportfreunde Lotte players
SC Wiedenbrück 2000 players
BV Cloppenburg players
2. Bundesliga players
3. Liga players